Zenovich is a surname. Notable people with the surname include: 

George N. Zenovich (1922–2013), American politician and jurist
Marina Zenovich, American filmmaker
Matthew Zenovich (born 1994), New Zealand cyclist
Tom Zenovich, Transnistrian politician